Grundtvig International Secondary School is a Nigerian independent boarding school in Oba, Anambra State, located just about twenty minutes’ drive from the Asaba Airport. It is named after Danish philosopher N. F. S. Grundtvig and is built upon his folk high school education-for-life principles for education. It educates boys and girls 12 to 18 years old and was founded in 1998 by Dr. Kachi E. Ozumba (1942–2011).The school has repeatedly featured among the top ten performing schools in Nigeria based on its West African Examinations Council (WAEC) results, and was ranked fifth in Nigeria in 2014. In 2020, the School won the Presidential Award as the Overall Best Private Secondary School in Nigeria in the President's Teachers' and Schools Excellence Awards (PTSEA). The award, which came with a brand new bus, was presented to the School at Abuja on 5 October 2020 as highlight of the events marking the World Teachers’ Day

Overview
The Board of Trustees of the Grundtvig Movement oversees the operations of the School through the school principal.

References

External links

Grundtvig Int'l Secondary School official website

International schools in Nigeria
N. F. S. Grundtvig